The Randy Rhoads Years is a compilation album by American heavy metal band Quiet Riot that features songs from Randy Rhoads' time with the band in the late 1970s.  It features previously unreleased material and some remixed songs from Quiet Riot's first two albums which were released only in Japan.  These two albums, Quiet Riot and Quiet Riot II, have yet to see any sort of release outside Japan due to the wishes of the Rhoads family.

Changes and remixing
None of the songs on The Randy Rhoads Years are the same versions that appear on the original two Quiet Riot albums. At the request of the Rhoads family, longtime Quiet Riot vocalist Kevin DuBrow remixed all the tracks, except the previously unreleased "Force of Habit" as its multitrack master tapes had been lost.

Lead vocals were re-recorded on all tracks except "Force of Habit" by Kevin DuBrow.  In one case, he rewrote the lyrics with ex-Rainbow drummer Bobby Rondinelli.  This track,  "Last Call for Rock 'n' Roll" was formerly titled "Mama's Little Angels" on Quiet Riot.  The drums on all tracks but "Force of Habit" were re-sampled, and the guitar tracks were played through Carlos Cavazo's Marshall amplifiers to duplicate the sound that Randy Rhoads achieved in Ozzy Osbourne's band.  According to DuBrow, Rhoads was never happy with his guitar tone while in Quiet Riot, but very satisfied with his tone while with Osbourne as he could afford better equipment by then.

The song "Trouble" was sped up as DuBrow felt the original was too slow.  DuBrow also added wah-wah to one guitar solo, playing the pedal himself through the original guitar tracks.  Again, Rhoads could not afford a wah-wah pedal at the time of recording, but wished he had played the solo with one.  "Afterglow (Of Your Love)" from Quiet Riot II was stripped down, leaving just Rhoads' acoustic guitar in an "unplugged" arrangement. DuBrow used triangle samples to disguise background noise that could not be removed from the track.  The sole live track, "Laughing Gas", featured an extended guitar solo that was spliced together from two separate recordings. It featured pieces of Rhoads' later songs "Goodbye to Romance", "Dee", and perhaps his best known song, the hit "Crazy Train". It also features parts of the "RR" solo outtake that was lost and found during the mixing for the 2011 Expanded Legacy Edition for Blizzard of Ozz and was put on the reissue as a bonus track.

The package features only six of the Japanese album tracks in remixed or re-written versions. The rest of those songs remain unreleased outside Japan.  The rest of the album is filled out with unreleased songs.

Track listing

Credits

Quiet Riot
Kevin DuBrow - lead vocals, triangle, wah-wah
Randy Rhoads - guitars
Kelly Garni - bass
Drew Forsyth - drums

Additional musicians
Kenny Hillery - bass

Production
Kevin DuBrow - producer
Lee DeCarlo - producer
Warren Entner - producer
Derek Lawrence - producer

Sequel album and home video
At the time of release of The Randy Rhoads Years, DuBrow said in the 1993 interview with Guitar for the Practicing Musician that two more releases were forthcoming. He mentioned a second volume featuring more remixed and unreleased tracks, including Quiet Riot's version of "Quinn the Eskimo (The Mighty Quinn)". According to DuBrow, the release of any further tracks completely depended on their quality, and approval by the Rhoads family. He also said a home video release was forthcoming of an early Quiet Riot club show featuring Rhoads. This same video provided the audio for one half of the live version of "Laughing Gas" on The Randy Rhoads Years.  To date, neither of these releases have seen the light of day; DuBrow had championed the release of the Rhoads material, and his 2007 death makes the release of any further Rhoads material unlikely.

References

Quiet Riot albums
1993 compilation albums
Rhino Records compilation albums
Randy Rhoads